Brea may refer to:

Mythology 
 Brea (mythology), an Irish mythological god

People 
 Anthony José Brea Salazar, a Venezuelan professional racing cyclist
 Armando Bréa, a Brazilian middle-distance runner
 Benjamín Brea, a Venezuelan musician
 Brea Grant, an American actress
 Cirilo de Alameda y Brea O.F.M. Obs. (1781-1872), Spanish cardinal of the Roman Catholic Church
 Diego de Brea, Slovenian theatre director
 Jennifer Brea, an American documentary filmmaker and activist
 Julián Brea, Argentine professional football forward 
 Lesli Brea, a former Major League Baseball player
 Ludovico Brea, a Renaissance painter
 Luigi Bernabò Brea, Italian archaeologist
 María Isabel Soldevila Brea, Dominican journalist, academician, and television presenter
 Teodosio César Brea, Argentine lawyer

Places 
 Brea, California, United States
 Brea, Cornwall, United Kingdom
 Brea (Chalcidice), a town of ancient Macedonia, Greece
 Brea (Thrace), an ancient Greek colony founded by Athens
 Brea de Tajo, a municipality of Madrid, in central Spain
 Brea de Aragón, a municipality located in the province of Zaragoza, Aragon, Spain
 La Brea, Trinidad and Tobago, a town located northeast of Point Fortin and southwest of San Fernando, southern Trinidad and Tobago

Fictional characters 
 Aya Brea, the protagonist in the Parasite Eve video game series.

Other uses
 Brea (fly), a signal fly in the Platystomatinae subfamily of flies (Diptera)

See also 
 La Brea (disambiguation)
 Bria, Central African Republic